Kavarna Municipality is a municipality (obshtina) in Dobrich Province, Northeastern Bulgaria, located on the Northern Bulgarian Black Sea Coast in Southern Dobruja geographical region. It is named after its administrative centre - the town of Kavarna.

Geographically, the area is best known with the long and narrow headland of Kaliakra.
The main road E87 crosses the municipality connecting the port of Varna with the Romanian port of Constanța.

Settlements 

Kavarna Municipality includes the following 21 places (towns are shown in bold):

Demography 
The following table shows the change of the population during the last four decades.

Religion 
According to the latest Bulgarian census of 2011, the religious composition, among those who answered the optional question on religious identification, was the following:

See also
Provinces of Bulgaria
Municipalities of Bulgaria
List of cities and towns in Bulgaria

References

External links
 Official website 

Municipalities in Dobrich Province